Elwha is an unincorporated community in Clallam County, Washington, United States.  The community is located along U.S. Route 101 about 9 miles from Port Angeles, on the northern edge of the Olympic National Park. The community is located on the Elwha River; where the Elwha Ecosystem Restoration Project took place.

The National Park Service usually staffs a ranger station for Olympic National Park in Elwha, although it is currently closed. There is also a small interpretive site commemorating the Elwha River Restoration Project.

References

Unincorporated communities in Washington (state)
Unincorporated communities in Clallam County, Washington